Jaromír Jindráček (born 1 February 1970) is a Czech former football player who later became a football manager. He played in the Czech First League for seven seasons, representing five different clubs.

He was appointed head coach of Czech First League team Bohemians Prague in August 2009, replacing Robert Žák. After relegation from the Czech First League in his first season, he led Bohemians to first place with a record 80 points in the Bohemian Football League in the 2010–11 season. He left his position in June 2011, when he was replaced by František Barát. He returned to Bohemians in 2012 but was replaced by Ivan Pihávek in October 2012, having held a record of one win, seven draws and one loss in the first nine league games of the season.

References

External links
 Profile at idnes.cz 

1970 births
Living people
Czech footballers
Czechoslovak footballers
Czech First League players
SK Dynamo České Budějovice players
FK Hvězda Cheb players
SK Slavia Prague players
FK Jablonec players
FK Teplice players
Czech football managers
Czech First League managers
FK Bohemians Prague (Střížkov) managers
Association football midfielders